Hsinchu metropolitan area is the metropolitan area of the city of Hsinchu in northern Taiwan. 

The population of the metro area in 2016 was around 1,000,000, and when including Zhunan and Toufen in neighboring Miaoli County was over 1.18 million.

Definition
According to the definition of metropolitan areas formerly used by the Republic of China (Taiwan) government, Hsinchu metropolitan area includes the following areas:

However, since 2010, the term is no longer in official usage.

References 

Metropolitan areas of Taiwan